The Palawan flying squirrel or tapilak (Hylopetes nigripes) is a species of rodent in the family Sciuridae. It is endemic to the Philippines.

Its natural habitat is subtropical or tropical dry forests.

Its population is decreasing as time goes on. It is a nocturnal species, and is mainly being destroyed by deforestation

References

Rodents of the Philippines
Hylopetes
Mammals described in 1893
Taxa named by Oldfield Thomas
Endemic fauna of the Philippines
Fauna of Palawan
Taxonomy articles created by Polbot